Missaglia is a comune in Italy.

Missaglia may also refer to:

Missaglia (surname)